Freedom (often referred to as the Freedom app) is a computer program designed to keep a computer user away from the Internet for up to eight hours at a time.  It is described as a way to "free you from distractions, allowing you time to write, analyze, code, or create." The program was written by Fred Stutzman, a Ph.D student at the University of North Carolina at Chapel Hill.

References

External links

Freedom app website: https://freedom.to/
Internet Protocol based network software